Puraperla dela Cruz Sumangil (born 1941), better known as Pura Sumangil, is a Filipino Catholic nun, educator, and social activist. She is one of the co-founders of Concerned Citizens of Abra for Good Governance, an NGO that engages in participatory monitoring of infrastructure projects in the Cordillera Administrative Region in northern Philippines.

In 2022, she was announced as one of the recipients of the Pro Ecclesia et Pontifice award by the Holy See. She was also nominated for the 2005 Nobel Peace Prize.

Early Life and Education

Pura Sumangil was born in 1941 in Nueva Ecija province and moved to Abra province in 1970 to become an Auxiliary under the local Bishop, where she has remained. She obtained her bachelor's degree in education at Divine Word College of Bangued as well as a master's degree in development management from the Asian Institute of Management. She was also nominated for the 2005 Nobel Peace Prize.

A Catholic nun, she belongs to the Auxiliaries of the Apostolate.

Activism

Throughout her time in Abra, Pura has served as a community organizer. Sumangil collaborated with the Itneg people in the late 1980s to assist in the reconstruction of war-torn communities in the uplands of northern Luzon. In 1986, she co-founded the Concerned Citizens of Abra for Good Government (CCAGG), a civil society organization focused on government monitoring, empowerment, and citizenship building.

Following the 1986 Philippine snap election, Sumangil worked with like-minded individuals to establish the CCAGG, while volunteering at the National Movement for Free Elections (NAMFREL). Despite facing death threats from local government officials due to the group's efforts to expose corruption, they have instituted partnerships with international networks and government agencies to support their mission. She was also nominated for the 2005 Nobel Peace Prize.

As a co-convener of the National Unification Commission, which is now the Office of the Presidential Adviser on the Peace Process, Sumangil was consulted on the causes of community unrest in the Cordillera Autonomous Region. She also assisted rebel returnees in Abra and the Cordillera, connecting them with government agencies, funding agencies, and NGOs for their development projects and scholarship programs.

She collaborated with various organizations that advocate for peace and good governance, including the United Nations Development Program, Transparency International, the National Peace Council, Cordillera Peace Forum, Commission on Audit, NAMFREL, and local government units in Abra. She has presented papers at international conferences held in The Hague, Bangkok, and New York. Additionally, Pura is a member of Abra's Council of Elders, which facilitates peace negotiations between conflicting politicians.

An educator, Sumangil also served as the Director of the Abraeniana Institute and Research Centre at the Divine World College of Bangued, as well as Director for Research and  Community Extension at the same institution.

Recognitions

Her work has been recognized through numerous accolades, including the following:

 Aurora Aragon Quezon Peace Award, in 1997
 Most Active NGO Chairperson from ARYA ABRA Foundation
 Pro Ecclesia et Pontifice, in 2022

References

Asian Institute of Management alumni
Filipino activists